Krikorian is an Armenian surname.  It is a patronym from the Armenian equivalent of Gregory.

It may refer to:

 Adam Krikorian
 Blake Krikorian, American entrepreneur, envisioned the concept of the Slingbox establishing Sling Media with Jason Krikorian 
 David Krikorian, Cincinnati politician and Ohio congressional candidate
 Kirk Kerkorian, an American businessman, investor, and philanthropist
 Krikor Krikorian, technical consulting, co-founder of KBC Advanced Technologies
 Mark Krikorian (fl. c. 2000), executive director of the Center for Immigration Studies
 Mark Krikorian (born 1960), American soccer coach
 Raffi Krikorian, creator of Wattzon and engineering at Twitter 
 Steve M. Krikorian (born 1950), aka Tonio K, musician
 Michael John Krikorian (born 1975), American Restauranteur, Il Terrazzo Portland

See also
 Krikorian Premier Theaters
 Kerkorian - a variant of Krikorian
 Kerkorian (surname)
 Grigoryan (disambiguation) - a variant of Krikorian

References

Armenian-language surnames
Patronymic surnames
Surnames from given names